Vladimir Vasilyevich Karpov (28 July 1922 – 18 January 2010) was a Soviet soldier, writer of historical novels and public figure. He was awarded the Hero of the Soviet Union for bravery in World War II.

Karpov was born in Orenburg, and moved to Tashkent as a child. He graduated from the Tashkent Military academy in 1941 when he was also middleweight boxing champion of Uzbekistan. He was repressed in 1941 and transferred to a punishment battalion on the Kalinin Front in 1942. He was rehabilitated due to bravery in the face of the enemy in 1943 and promoted to lieutenant. He was awarded the Hero of the Soviet Union in 1944 for capturing 79 prisoners.

After the war, Karpov attended the Frunze Military Academy (1947) and served in Central Asia, retiring as a regimental commander and chief of staff of a division in 1966.

Karpov started writing in 1945 and graduated from the Maxim Gorky Literature Institute via a correspondence course in 1954. From 1966 he was editor of the magazine Oktyabr in Uzbekistan and became editor of the magazine Novy Mir between 1981 and 1986. From 1986 to 1991, he was first secretary of the Union of Soviet Writers.

Karpov died in Moscow and is buried in Troyekurovskoye Cemetery.

Awards
 Hero of the Soviet Union
 Order of Lenin (2)
 Order of the October Revolution
 Order of the Red Banner
 Order of the Patriotic War 1st class
 Order of the Red Star (2)
 Medal "For Courage"
 Medal "For Battle Merit"
 Order of the Red Banner of Labour
 campaign and jubilee medals

Bibliography
In English
The Commander, Brassey's Inc, 1987
Russia at War, Vendome Press, 1987 (introduction by Karpov)
 Маршальский жезл ("Marshal's Baton" 1970)
 Взять живым! ("Take Him Alive" 1974), a novel
 Не мечом единым ("Not by Sword Alone" 1979), a novel
 Полководец ("Commander" 1984) – documentary about General Ivan Yefimovich Petrov
 Маршал Жуков, его соратники и противники в годы войны и мира», memoirs of Marshal Georgy Zhukov in two volumes, (1989);
 Маршал Жуков. Опала (1994)
 Расстрелянные маршалы ("Executed Marshals" 1999)
 Генералиссимус», в 2 томах ("Generalissimo" 2002) – a biography of Joseph Stalin
 Маршал Баграмян "Мы много пережили в тиши после войны" (2006) memoirs of Ivan Bagramyan

Sources
Hronos in Russian
warheroes.ru in Russian
Portrait

1922 births
2010 deaths
20th-century Russian male writers
21st-century Russian male writers
People from Orenburg
Central Committee of the Communist Party of the Soviet Union members
Eleventh convocation members of the Soviet of Nationalities
Frunze Military Academy alumni
Maxim Gorky Literature Institute alumni
Heroes of the Soviet Union
Recipients of the Medal "For Courage" (Russia)
Recipients of the Medal "For Distinction in Guarding the State Border of the USSR"
Recipients of the Medal of Zhukov
Recipients of the Order "For Merit to the Fatherland", 4th class
Recipients of the Order of Lenin
Recipients of the Order of Merit (Ukraine), 3rd class
Recipients of the Order of the Red Banner
Recipients of the Order of the Red Banner of Labour
Recipients of the Order of the Red Star
Recipients of the USSR State Prize
Neo-Stalinists
Novy Mir editors
Socialist realism writers
Russian editors
Russian male novelists
Russian male writers
Russian television presenters
Soviet colonels
Soviet editors
Soviet male writers
Soviet military personnel of World War II
Soviet novelists
Soviet television presenters
Burials in Troyekurovskoye Cemetery